Babatunde Niyi Ogunlana (born August 14, 1984 in Patako) is a former Nigerian football player, who was last playing for Kwara United F.C. of Ilorin.

Career 
Hails from Patako in the Ifelodun local government area of Kwara State, he is otherwise called ‘Overmars'. He attended St. Joseph's Nursery & Primary School, Ilorin and the Government Secondary School, Ilorin (1992). He obtained his first degree, BSc (Geography) from the University of Ilorin-Nigeria (1997).

He has played for Kwara Stars F.C. of Ilorin (1997–2001), Katsina United F.C. of Katsina (2001–2003), Kwara United F.C. of Ilorin (2004 to date).

Retirement
After retiring was named as Welfare officer of Kwara United F.C.

References

1984 births
Living people
Yoruba sportspeople
Nigerian footballers
Katsina United F.C. players
Association football midfielders
Kwara United F.C. players